The Yakutsk Constituency (No.24) is a Russian legislative constituency in the  Sakha Republic (Yakutia). The constituency is the only one in Sakha Republic, and occupies the whole of its territory. Yakutsk Constituency is also the largest single-mandate territorial constituency in the world (roughly the size of India).

Members elected

Election results

1993

|-
! colspan=2 style="background-color:#E9E9E9;text-align:left;vertical-align:top;" |Candidate
! style="background-color:#E9E9E9;text-align:left;vertical-align:top;" |Party
! style="background-color:#E9E9E9;text-align:right;" |Votes
! style="background-color:#E9E9E9;text-align:right;" |%
|-
|style="background-color: " |
|align=left|Yegor Zhirkov
|align=left|Independent
|149,443
|36.50%
|-
|style="background-color: "|
|align=left|Yury Pozdnyakov
|align=left|Independent
| -
|12.35%
|-
| colspan="5" style="background-color:#E9E9E9;"|
|- style="font-weight:bold"
| colspan="3" style="text-align:left;" | Total
| 409,461
| 100%
|-
| colspan="5" style="background-color:#E9E9E9;"|
|- style="font-weight:bold"
| colspan="4" |Source:
|
|}

1995

|-
! colspan=2 style="background-color:#E9E9E9;text-align:left;vertical-align:top;" |Candidate
! style="background-color:#E9E9E9;text-align:left;vertical-align:top;" |Party
! style="background-color:#E9E9E9;text-align:right;" |Votes
! style="background-color:#E9E9E9;text-align:right;" |%
|-
|style="background-color:"|
|align=left|Zoya Kornilova
|align=left|Power to the People!
|110,567
|28.38%
|-
|style="background-color: "|
|align=left|Yegor Zhirkov (incumbent)
|align=left|Independent
|110,245
|28.30%
|-
|style="background-color: "|
|align=left|Valery Guminsky
|align=left|Independent
|37,128
|9.53%
|-
|style="background-color: "|
|align=left|Vyacheslav Filatov
|align=left|Independent
|33,452
|8.59%
|-
|style="background-color:#E98282"|
|align=left|Galina Vasilyeva
|align=left|Women of Russia
|24,579
|6.31%
|-
|style="background-color: "|
|align=left|Dmitry Tikhonov
|align=left|Independent
|11,564
|2.97%
|-
|style="background-color: "|
|align=left|Vasily Vinokurov
|align=left|Independent
|7,728
|1.98%
|-
|style="background-color:#1C1A0D"|
|align=left|Pyotr Sarychev
|align=left|Forward, Russia!
|7,454
|1.91%
|-
|style="background-color:#000000"|
|colspan=2 |against all
|39,409
|10.12%
|-
| colspan="5" style="background-color:#E9E9E9;"|
|- style="font-weight:bold"
| colspan="3" style="text-align:left;" | Total
| 389,552
| 100%
|-
| colspan="5" style="background-color:#E9E9E9;"|
|- style="font-weight:bold"
| colspan="4" |Source:
|
|}

1999

|-
! colspan=2 style="background-color:#E9E9E9;text-align:left;vertical-align:top;" |Candidate
! style="background-color:#E9E9E9;text-align:left;vertical-align:top;" |Party
! style="background-color:#E9E9E9;text-align:right;" |Votes
! style="background-color:#E9E9E9;text-align:right;" |%
|-
|style="background-color: "|
|align=left|Vitaly Basygysov
|align=left|Independent
|95,869
|26.00%
|-
|style="background-color:"|
|align=left|Zoya Kornilova (incumbent)
|align=left|Russian All-People's Union
|87,393
|23.70%
|-
|style="background-color: "|
|align=left|Artur Alekseyev
|align=left|Independent
|85,655
|23.23%
|-
|style="background-color: "|
|align=left|Sergey Shkurenko
|align=left|Independent
|31,629
|8.58%
|-
|style="background-color: "|
|align=left|Aleksandr Kim-Kimen
|align=left|Independent
|27,430
|7.44%
|-
|style="background-color: "|
|align=left|Ulyana Vinokurova
|align=left|Independent
|5,964
|1.62%
|-
|style="background-color: "|
|align=left|Ivan Cherov
|align=left|Independent
|4,588
|1.24%
|-
|style="background-color: "|
|align=left|Andrey Krivoshapkin-Ayynga
|align=left|Independent
|2,859
|0.78%
|-
|style="background-color:#000000"|
|colspan=2 |against all
|22,716
|6.16%
|-
| colspan="5" style="background-color:#E9E9E9;"|
|- style="font-weight:bold"
| colspan="3" style="text-align:left;" | Total
| 368,770
| 100%
|-
| colspan="5" style="background-color:#E9E9E9;"|
|- style="font-weight:bold"
| colspan="4" |Source:
|
|}

2003

|-
! colspan=2 style="background-color:#E9E9E9;text-align:left;vertical-align:top;" |Candidate
! style="background-color:#E9E9E9;text-align:left;vertical-align:top;" |Party
! style="background-color:#E9E9E9;text-align:right;" |Votes
! style="background-color:#E9E9E9;text-align:right;" |%
|-
|style="background-color: "|
|align=left|Vitaly Basygysov (incumbent)
|align=left|Independent
|196,646
|47.69%
|-
|style="background-color:"|
|align=left|Fedot Tumusov
|align=left|Rodina
|56,202
|13.63%
|-
|style="background-color:#00A1FF"|
|align=left|Semyon Nazarov
|align=left|Party of Russia's Rebirth-Russian Party of Life
|45,154
|10.95%
|-
|style="background-color:#1042A5"|
|align=left|Igor Treskov
|align=left|Union of Right Forces
|35,374
|8.58%
|-
|style="background-color: "|
|align=left|Aleksandr Gavrilyev
|align=left|Communist Party
|18,060
|4.38%
|-
|style="background-color:#7C73CC"|
|align=left|Ivan Shamayev
|align=left|Great Russia–Eurasian Union
|9,339
|2.26%
|-
|style="background-color:#164C8C"|
|align=left|Viktor Shemchuk
|align=left|United Russian Party Rus'
|3,661
|0.89%
|-
|style="background-color:#000000"|
|colspan=2 |against all
|41,686
|10.11%
|-
| colspan="5" style="background-color:#E9E9E9;"|
|- style="font-weight:bold"
| colspan="3" style="text-align:left;" | Total
| 412,340
| 100%
|-
| colspan="5" style="background-color:#E9E9E9;"|
|- style="font-weight:bold"
| colspan="4" |Source:
|
|}

2016

|-
! colspan=2 style="background-color:#E9E9E9;text-align:left;vertical-align:top;" |Candidate
! style="background-color:#E9E9E9;text-align:left;vertical-align:top;" |Party
! style="background-color:#E9E9E9;text-align:right;" |Votes
! style="background-color:#E9E9E9;text-align:right;" |%
|-
|style="background-color: " |
|align=left|Fedot Tumusov
|align=left|A Just Russia
|112,019
|37.52%
|-
|style="background-color: " |
|align=left|Oleg Tarasov
|align=left|Rodina
|61,048
|20.45%
|-
|style="background-color: "|
|align=left|Petr Ammosov
|align=left|Communist Party
|46,177
|15.47%
|-
|style="background: " |
|align=left|Gavril Parakhin
|align=left|Liberal Democratic Party
|20,303
|6.80%
|-
|style="background: " |
|align=left|Aisen Tikhonov
|align=left|Party of Growth
|13,366
|4.48%
|-
|style="background: " |
|align=left|Aleksandr Lazarev
|align=left|Communists of Russia
|11,719
|3.92%
|-
|style="background: ;" | 
|align=left|Aital Yefremov
|align=left|The Greens
|11,097
|3.72%
|-
|style="background-color: " |
|align=left|Andrey Zayakin
|align=left|Yabloko
|8,800
|2.95%
|-
| colspan="5" style="background-color:#E9E9E9;"|
|- style="font-weight:bold"
| colspan="3" style="text-align:left;" | Total
| 298,589
| 100%
|-
| colspan="5" style="background-color:#E9E9E9;"|
|- style="font-weight:bold"
| colspan="4" |Source:
|
|}

2021

|-
! colspan=2 style="background-color:#E9E9E9;text-align:left;vertical-align:top;" |Candidate
! style="background-color:#E9E9E9;text-align:left;vertical-align:top;" |Party
! style="background-color:#E9E9E9;text-align:right;" |Votes
! style="background-color:#E9E9E9;text-align:right;" |%
|-
|style="background-color: " |
|align=left|Petr Ammosov
|align=left|Communist Party
|69,215
|21.61%
|-
|style="background-color: " |
|align=left|Pyotr Cherkashin
|align=left|United Russia
|64,275
|20.07%
|-
|style="background-color: " |
|align=left|Fedot Tumusov (incumbent)
|align=left|A Just Russia — For Truth
|62,597
|19.55%
|-
|style="background-color: "|
|align=left|Vasily Nikolayev
|align=left|New People
|49,703
|15.52%
|-
|style="background: ;" | 
|align=left|Yegor Zhirkov
|align=left|The Greens
|20,067
|6.27%
|-
|style="background-color: " |
|align=left|Anatoly Nogovitsyn
|align=left|Yabloko
|18,322
|5.72%
|-
|style="background-color: " |
|align=left|Gavril Parakhin
|align=left|Liberal Democratic Party
|12,446
|3.89%
|-
|style="background-color: " |
|align=left|Anatoly Kyrdzhagasov
|align=left|Civic Platform
|8,611
|2.69%
|-
|style="background-color: "|
|align=left|Aleksey Laptev
|align=left|Rodina
|5,259
|1.64%
|-
| colspan="5" style="background-color:#E9E9E9;"|
|- style="font-weight:bold"
| colspan="3" style="text-align:left;" | Total
| 320,227
| 100%
|-
| colspan="5" style="background-color:#E9E9E9;"|
|- style="font-weight:bold"
| colspan="4" |Source:
|
|}

Notes

Sources
24. Якутский одномандатный избирательный округ

References

Russian legislative constituencies
Politics of the Sakha Republic